Grzbiet Lasocki is a mountain ridge in the eastern part of the Giant Mountains within the Western Sudetes. It is located on the Czech-Polish border. It is a small, 4 km long geomorphological formation. It is formed from metamorphic rocks.

References

External links

Geography of the Hradec Králové Region
Landforms of Lower Silesian Voivodeship